Ryan O'Reily is a main character in the television series Oz. He was portrayed by Dean Winters from 1997 to 2003.

Character overview
O'Reily is an Irish-American sociopathic hoodlum originally sentenced to 12 years to life for killing two people while driving under the influence of drugs and alcohol, then 40 to life after confessing to a murder he had his brother, Cyril, commit. Before he was arrested for his original crime he was running a street gang of Irish-American hoodlums called the Bridge Street Gang, with Cyril as his lieutenant/bodyguard. When his brother is permanently brain-damaged in a fight with a rival at a funeral, Ryan, blaming himself, goes on a drug and alcohol-fueled rampage throughout the city.

Highly intelligent and completely ruthless, O'Reily survives in Oz by manipulating everyone around him, and working with the most dangerous inmates using a variety of inmate gangs to get whatever he wants; series creator Tom Fontana has likened him to Iago, the villain of Shakespeare's Othello.

Ryan is extremely protective of his intellectually disabled brother Cyril, and has no qualms against striking anyone who threatens him, including prison guards. Above all else, Ryan strives to keep Cyril in Emerald City, where Ryan can protect him. Cyril in turn cares about Ryan and depends on him a great deal, usually obeying him, which leads to Ryan taking advantage of him more than once.

Fictional history

Season 1
He was the cause of nearly every death in the first season of Oz:
 In the pilot episode, he bribes the guards in solitary confinement to allow Johnny Post in to burn Dino Ortolani. He then betrayed Post to the Italian gang.
 He sets up Jefferson Keane to be killed. This backfires, but Keane goes to death row for killing one of his attackers.
 He proposes the idea to Simon Adebisi, to team up to feeds mafia boss Nino Schibetta ground glass over the course of a few weeks, causing him internal hemorrhaging.

With all his major competition eliminated, O'Reily becomes a major player in Oz's drug scene. He also plays a major role in introducing Tobias Beecher to heroin making him become addicted and later go insane on PCP and blind Vernon Schillinger the fearsome leader of Oz's Aryan Brotherhood in one eye. Schillinger is very anti drugs but this attack weakens him significantly. Ryan then became Beecher's main drug supplier.

Throughout the season O'Reily allies himself with the Italians and Homeboys, but behind their backs, he often calls the Italians "dagos" and "wops", the Homeboys "niggers", and the Latinos "spics".

Season 2
In the second season, O'Reily is enjoying his new status in the Oz drug scene when he is diagnosed with breast cancer. He is helped through his treatment and chemotherapy by Dr. Gloria Nathan, Oz's chief physician. O'Reily falls in love with her and is so overcome with jealousy of her husband that he tells his mentally handicapped brother, Cyril, who is on the outside to kill Dr. Nathan's husband.

Cyril is arrested and sent to Oz, but is put in a different unit from his brother. There, Cyril is raped by Vernon Schillinger and his Aryan Brotherhood gang. This enrages O'Reily, but he can't do anything about it. In order to protect Cyril, he asks the manager of his unit, Tim McManus, to transfer Cyril into Em City with him. McManus agrees in return for O'Reily's admission of guilt in Preston Nathan's death, which O'Reily refuses.

Later, when a guard is blinded by Miguel Alvarez and needs a blood transfusion, it turns out that O'Reily is the only prisoner in Oz to match his blood type. He uses this as leverage to secure a place for his brother in Em City with him. O'Reily then admits his guilt in Preston Nathan's murder so that he can remain in Oz to protect Cyril. McManus then informs him he will be brought up on charges for ordering the murder of Preston Nathan.

Season 3
Still eager for revenge on Schillinger, Ryan manipulates Jaz Hoyt into attacking Schillinger, but Schillinger escapes unharmed. Furious, O'Reily joins forces with Tobias Beecher and Chris Keller, two other inmates who are looking to get even with Schillinger. When Schillinger's son Andrew comes to Em City, O'Reily tortures him when he stops selling him drugs, forcing Andrew to buy them through non-white inmates. Because Andrew has been trained as a member of the Aryan Brotherhood, he can't bring himself to buy drugs from those inmates. After Andrew (having befriended and received counseling from Beecher and becoming clean from drugs) publicly embarrasses his father, Vern Schillinger, by ignoring his attempts to reconcile with him and renounces his racist beliefs, his humiliated father gives his son enough heroin to overdose when Andrew is sent to the hole as a kind of test - which he "fails" by dying.

Meanwhile, the prison administrators hire a new CO supervisor, Sean Murphy. Murphy and O'Reily bond over the Spanish Armada myth of the Black Irish and develop a kind of friendship. When Murphy organizes a boxing tournament, O'Reily enters Cyril. To ensure Cyril's victory, he spikes his opponents' water bottles with chloral hydrate. Cyril beats James Robson in the first round. As a result, Ryan wins money in the bets and the Aryans leave Cyril alone for good. From there, Ryan then spikes Miguel Alvarez's water and tells Alvarez's opponent, gay inmate Jason Cramer, that the Latinos will rape his lover if he loses the fight. Alvarez loses, the Latinos look worse, and Carmen Guerra grows suspicious of O'Reily's winning streak. In round two, Cyril must fight Italian inmate Chucky Pancamo. O'Reily arranges the death of William Cudney, who threatened to expose him for cheating, and spikes Pancamo's water with heroin. Cyril easily beats Pancamo.

Murphy discovers O'Reily cheating thanks to a tip from Nikolai Stanislofsky, and tells O'Reily to stop to prevent a riot. In order to allow Cyril to keep his edge and win the final fight against Muslim inmate Hamid Khan, O'Reily invites their abusive father to visit him and Cyril. Ryan then encourages Cyril to think about their father's abuse during the fight.  Pushed into a rage, Cyril beats Khan into a coma, making him brain dead. The resulting racial tension forces Oz into a lockdown.

Season 4 Part I
O'Reily and Cyril participate in an interaction session with Gloria Nathan and her deceased husband's parents. Nathan wants him there to condemn him for killing her husband, but O'Reily turns the tables on them when he says that she and McManus had an affair. She is later raped by Irish hoodlum Patrick Keenan, and she suspects O'Reily of setting her up. Although he didn't, he tells her that he did so she can feel whole again. O'Reily then kills Keenan. Nathan takes a leave of absence shortly after.

O'Reily also has a dispute over possession of a contraband cell phone with Nikolai Stanislofsky, eventually resulting in Stanislofsky's demise at the hands of Officer Claire Howell, a CO whom he begins to have occasional sex with, though he quickly tries to put an end to it.

In Em City, white and Latino inmates and guards are constantly being traded for black guards and inmates who support Adebisi, so O'Reily and Keller unite to turn the tables. They murder inmates Nate Shemin and Mondo Browne, and frame Supreme Allah. As a result, Unit Manager Martin Querns is fired and McManus is rehired.

Season 4 Part II
A television crew comes to Oz to film the prisoners' daily lives, headed by Jack Eldridge, a reporter who once reported on Irish gang activity in general, and the O'Reilys in particular. This report exposed them as criminals to their mother, who was emotionally devastated upon finding out. In his interview with Eldridge, O'Reily gets some revenge on Eldridge by refusing to give any information about Adebisi's death. Meanwhile, Dr. Nathan returns to Oz and admits to prison psychiatrist Sister Peter Marie that she did indeed have feelings for O'Reily, which Sister Pete encourages her to put out of her mind.

Supreme Allah is released from solitary and tells O'Reily that he knows who framed him, so O'Reily and Keller go to Burr Redding and ask that he be eliminated. Redding then has Tug Daniels visit and stab Supreme Allah, who was in Oz for murdering Daniels' brother.

A woman named Suzanne Fitzgerald (Betty Buckley) comes to visit, claiming to be his birth mother. O'Reily does not believe her at first, but accepts it after his father tells him about her. His mother turns out to be a 1960s radical on the run who is looking to settle down.

Asian inmate Jia Kenmin tells Cyril that he will teach him karate, resulting in a fight that puts Jia into a coma. The staff, remembering Hamid Khan, threaten to send Cyril to a mental institution. Meanwhile, Provisional IRA member Padraig Connolly arrives and plans with O'Reily to blow up Em City. At the last minute, O'Reily decides that it is wrong and that many people including his brother and Dr. Nathan may be harmed, but Connolly attempts to set off the bomb early. The bomb, however, fails to detonate, and O'Reily goes unpunished since he had tried to rid Em City of the bomb.

Season 5
O'Reily's mother turns herself in and Governor James Devlin reduces her charge to a two-year community service sentence at Oz. Inmate Li Chen arrives shortly afterward, and Jia Kenmin plots with him to put the O'Reily brothers on death row. He pays inmate Glen Shupe to lie to Cyril about Chen planning to rape Fitzgerald. Cyril and Ryan attack the two, and Cyril stabs and kills Chen while defending his brother, and stands trial for murder. The O'Reily family decides that Cyril is too mentally scarred to live, so they do not oppose his trial.

O'Reily, in the meantime, shares a cell with Father Daniel Meehan, an Irish-American priest imprisoned for his part in a violent protest, who helped prison psychiatrist Sister Peter Marie Raimondo fight for Cyril's life. After finding out that Shupe was paid to lie, O'Reily plots revenge. Picking up on the grudge between Kenmin and Enrique Morales, O'Reily makes a deal with the Latinos. The Latinos agree to horribly injure Shupe, making sure it won't be traced back to O'Reily; in return, O'Reily agrees to murder Jia. The Latinos cut off Shupe's arm, and O'Reily provokes Kenmin into a fight where he ends up helping the guards restrain Kenmin. He convinces officer Robinson that Kenmin talked badly of the guards and, as a result, they kill him in the solitary confinement ward.

Motivated by O'Reily's previous bad blood with the Aryans, O'Reily and Poet announce in the cafeteria that Aryan James Robson had the gums of a black man surgically implanted, with O'Reily citing aloud that he "went to the dentist, and got himself a nice pair of dirty ghetto gums", and the whole cafeteria erupts in laughter. Robson is kicked out of the Brotherhood for his "black blood", leaving him defenseless from the other prisoners.

With Meehan's guidance, O'Reily opens up about his childhood traumas and, after a while, finally joins the effort to save Cyril. His brother is nevertheless sentenced to death. O'Reily vows to be there in the appeal process.

Season 6
O'Reily forces Shupe to tell the truth to Cyril's attorney Arnold Zelman, who is unable to get him to testify. Shortly afterward, Meehan dies from a brain embolism, Ryan then washes the body in the morgue, reading a piece from the bible out of respect for Meehan. Peter Schibetta, the son of Nino Schibetta (the former leader of the Italian gang, who was killed by O'Reily in the first season), is rumored to have killed him by giving him "the evil eye" in return for O'Reily having killed his father, since Schibetta had previously vowed to curse everyone O'Reily loves. O'Reily goes to Chucky Pancamo and tells him that Schibetta plans to use the evil eye on the superstitious Pancamo as revenge for his failure to protect him from his brutal rape from Adebisi. Enraged, Pancamo and the Italians have Schibetta killed, notably removing his eye. It's throughout this season that Zelman unsuccessfully appeals Cyril's case.

Jahfree Neema, a former Black Panther, is sent to Oz and turns out to be connected romantically to Suzanne. He initially hates O'Reily, who tries to get Redding to murder him. Neema, however, tells O'Reily that he wants to save Cyril, and he organizes every inmate from every gang to protest the execution, resulting in a last second stay of execution and as a result, Ryan gains respect for him. O'Reily also believes God saved Cyril because of his sincere prayers on what was meant to be the night of Cyril's execution.

Meanwhile, their father, Seamus, arrives in Oz and tries to kill Neema, but ends up in the hospital instead. Eventually, Cyril is executed despite Ryan's efforts, it's during the execution that Ryan is seen walking the maze in the gym unsupervised and visibly upset. Dr. Nathan enters the gym and she and O'Reily kiss passionately,  culminating the five-season narrative arc initiated by O'Reily's unrequited love. The screen then fades to black, leaving the two.

Seamus O'Reily, while in the hospital, has come to regret how he treated his sons (with the help of a stern speech given to him by Suzanne) and asks Ryan if he can see Cyril, Ryan tells him it's too late as Cyril has already been executed, the father and son then reconnect through their grief.

Ryan O'Reily is last seen wheeling Seamus onto a bus during an attack involving a mysterious contaminate orchestrated by Keller.

Murders committed

Two construction workers - Ran over by a car, while Ryan was intoxicated.
Nino Schibetta - Killed by Ryan and Adebisi, to take over his drug trade in Oz.
Patrick Keenan - Killed by Ryan for raping Gloria Nathan, as an attempt to earn her love.
Supreme Allah - Killed by Ryan via food poisoning (on a tip given by Augustus Hill).

Reception
Sean O'Sullivan and David Wilson describe the character as "the arch schemer," while USA Today labels him as "Oz's resident troublemaker".

O'Sullivan and Wilson also write that "O'Reily is one of the most appealing characters in the show, and someone whom it is possible to follow because of his continuing story arc...O'Reily's Machiavellian scheming is one of the main entertainment features of the show."

References

External links
 Official character biography at Oz website

Fictional drug dealers
Fictional murderers
Fictional mass murderers
Fictional rampage and spree killers
Oz (TV series) characters
Fictional characters with cancer
Television characters introduced in 1997
Fictional career criminals
Fictional heroin users
Fictional Irish American people
Fictional gangsters
American male characters in television